Sakari "Zachary" Hietala (born August 10, 1962 in Tervo, Finland) is the guitarist, co-songwriter and founding member of Finnish heavy metal band Tarot (formerly Purgatory) in early 1980s, together with his younger brother Marko Hietala, who joined Nightwish in 2001. Zachary works as a youth instructor in his hometown, Kuopio, as well as teaching music theory to ninth and tenth grade students, and takes part in the management of the official Tarot website, responding to questions and comments made by fans on the forum. Zachary is friendly and fun-loving.
 
Tarot has so far released eight studio albums, latest has been released in early 2010. The next year after, the band rerecorded The Spell of Iron with updated sound and few lyric changes. 
Zachary Hietala plays guitar in Marenne, and is one of the composers in the band's debut album that was released in February 2009.

Discography

Tarot
The Spell of Iron (1986)
Follow Me into Madness (1988)
To Live Forever (1993)
To Live Again Live CD (1994)
Stigmata (1995)
For the Glory of Nothing (1998)
Shining Black Best of (2003)
Suffer Our Pleasures (2003)
Crows Fly Black (2006)
Undead Indeed Live DVD (2008)
Gravity of Light (2010)
The Spell of Iron MMXI (2011)

Marenne
The Past Prelude (2009)

References

1962 births
Living people
People from Tervo
Finnish heavy metal guitarists
Finnish male musicians
Tarot (band) members